West Midlands County Council (WMCC) was, from 1974 to 1986, the upper-tier administrative body for the West Midlands county, a metropolitan county in England.

History
The WMCC existed for a total of twelve years. It was established on 1 April 1974, by the Local Government Act 1972 and was abolished on 31 March 1986. It was abolished along with five other metropolitan county councils and the Greater London Council by the government of Margaret Thatcher under the Local Government Act 1985.

The WMCC was a strategic authority running regional services such as transport, emergency services, and strategic planning. Elections were held to the council in 1973, 1977 and 1981. Elections were due to be held in 1985 but were cancelled due to the council's impending abolition. The Labour Party controlled the council from 1974 to 1977, with the Conservatives controlling it 1977–81. It reverted to Labour control for the last term 1981–86.

Premises

The first meeting of the shadow authority was held on 30 April 1973 at Council House, Birmingham. Meetings were held at Council House throughout the county council's existence. The county council established its main administrative offices at County Hall, 1 Lancaster Circus, in central Birmingham. Since the county council's abolition in 1986, County Hall  has been occupied, but not as its headquarters, by Birmingham City Council.

Political control
The first election to the council was held in 1973, initially operating as a shadow authority before coming into its powers on 1 April 1974. Political control of the council from 1974 until its abolition in 1986 was held by the following parties:

Leadership
The leaders of the council were:

Council elections
Elections were held to the West Midlands County Council three times, in 1973, 1977, and 1981.

Elections were due to be held in 1985 but these were cancelled due to the council's impending abolition. Those councillors elected in 1981 had their terms of office extended until the council's abolition on 31 March 1986.

See also
 West Midlands Combined Authority
 West Midlands Passenger Transport Executive

References

History of the West Midlands (county)
Former county councils of England
Local government in the West Midlands (county)
1974 establishments in England
1986 disestablishments in England
Organizations established in 1974
Organizations disestablished in 1986
20th century in the West Midlands (county)
1970s in the West Midlands (county)
1980s in the West Midlands (county)